Belkuchi is an upazila, or subdistrict of Sirajganj district in the Division of Rajshahi, Bangladesh.

Geography
There are two main rivers, Jamuna and Hurasagar. Chandni Beel is an important water body.

The upazila is bounded by Sirajganj sadar upazila on the north, Shahjadpur and Chauhali upazilas on the south, Kalihati and Tangail Sadar upazilas on the east, Kamarkhanda and Ullahpara upazilas on the west.

Demographics
As of the 2011 Bangladesh census, Belkuchi has a population of 352835. Males constitute 179738 of the population, and females 173097.  Belkuchi has an average literacy rate of 33.6% (7+ years), and the national average of 32.4% literate.

Administration
Belkuchi Thana was formed in 1921 and it was turned into an upazila in 1983.

Belkuchi Upazila is divided into Belkuchi Municipality and six union parishads: Bara Dhul, Belkuchi, Bhangabari, Daulatpur, Dhukariabera, and Rajapur. The union parishads are subdivided into 94 mauzas and 131 villages.

Belkuchi Municipality is subdivided into 9 wards and 14 mahallas.

Education
Shernagar Fazil Degree Madrasah
Chak Shohagpur Government Primary School
Delua Islamia Alim Madrasah
Shohagpur Notunpara A.S High School
Belkuchi Model College
Belkuchi College
 Megulla Fazil (Degree) Madrasha
Sohagpur S.K Pilot Government Model High School
 Oxford Scholars School
Sohagpur Pilot Girls High School
 Tamai Multilateral High School.
 Tamai Grils High School 
Pastoral Academy

See also
Upazilas of Bangladesh
Districts of Bangladesh
Divisions of Bangladesh

References

Upazilas of Sirajganj District